Xian Hui (born March 1958) is a Chinese politician of Hui ethnic heritage. She is serving as Chairwoman (Governor) of Ningxia Hui Autonomous Region from July 2016. Along with Bu Xiaolin of Inner Mongolia and Shen Yiqin of Guizhou, Xian Hui is one of only three women to hold a provincial government leadership position in China, as of 2016.

Career
Xian Hui was born in Dingxi prefecture, Gansu in March 1958. During Down to the Countryside Movement, she became a Sent-down youth in Dingxi, performing manual labour. Between 1978 and 1981, she joined one of the first batches of students to be admitted to post-secondary education following the Cultural Revolution and took up studies in Chinese literature at the Minzu University of China. After university, she returned to her home province, and began working in the provincial United Front Work Department, where she would rise steadily through its career ladder and serve until 2005, eventually rising to head the old cadres bureau and the deputy head of the Gansu United Front Department.

In 2003, Xian was appointed as deputy head of the party's Organization Department of Gansu. In March 2007, Xian was named vice-governor. She was named to the provincial party standing committee in April 2012. In May 2015, she became executive vice-governor; she served until July 2016.

On 3 July 2016, Xian was named Chairwoman of Ningxia, a region bordering Gansu. Xian's ascension to the chairwoman's office marked the only known instance in the history of the People's Republic during which one woman succeeded another woman in a leading provincial party or government position. She was confirmed as government by the regional People's Congress on 19 September 2016.

References 

Living people
1958 births
Chinese Communist Party politicians from Gansu
People's Republic of China politicians from Gansu
People from Dingxi
Political office-holders in Ningxia
Hui people
Lanzhou University alumni
Minzu University of China alumni
Alternate members of the 17th Central Committee of the Chinese Communist Party
Alternate members of the 18th Central Committee of the Chinese Communist Party
Members of the 18th Central Committee of the Chinese Communist Party
21st-century Chinese women politicians
21st-century Chinese politicians
Members of the 19th Central Committee of the Chinese Communist Party